Hineman (also Romanized as Hīnemān and Hinamān; also known as Ḩīnehmān) is a village in Derakhtengan Rural District, in the Central District of Kerman County, Kerman Province, Iran. At the 2006 census, its population was 90, in 24 families.

References 

Populated places in Kerman County